Threekingham (sometimes Threckingham or Tricengham) is a village in the North Kesteven district of Lincolnshire, England. The population of the civil parish at the 2011 census was 233. Mareham Lane, the Roman Road aligned with King Street, crosses the A15 at Threekingham.

History 
The name of the town means "home of Tric's people." Tric is a Brittonic personal name, though it is unclear whether Tric himself was a Briton or whether he was descended from Anglo-Saxon migrants but given a name borrowed from Celtic speakers who possibly lived nearby. Either way, Threekingham itself is a Germanic name, given by speakers of Old English.

A folk etymology that developed in the later Anglo-Saxon period derives the name from "home of the three kings," supposedly because three Danish kings were buried there; however, this is incorrect.

Threekingham parish church is dedicated to St. Peter ad Vincula (St Peter in chains). The village public house is the Three Kings Inn.

The Domesday Book of 1086 records two churches in Threekingham; St Peter and St Mary. The church of St Mary was at Stow Green. Funerary remains have been found at Stow Green date back to the 11th- and 12th-century, and the church survived until the 18th century. It is possible that it was the site of an Early Medieval nunnery, founded in the late 7th century by St Werburgh and dedicated to St Ætheldreda. It was probably destroyed by the Danes c.870.

Historian David Roffe describes St Ætheldreda's connection with Stow Green, saying the site, called "Ædeldreðestowe," was chosen because the saint's staff took root and sprouted leaves there.

'Stow' is well known to be a place name denoting a holy place, or a burial place. According to Eilert Ekwall, "Old English 'stow' is recorded in senses such as 'place', 'inhabited place', 'holy place, hermitage, monastery', probably 'church'."

It is possible that it was the site of the early medieval nunnery founded in the late 7th century by Saint Werburh, dedicated to Saint Æthelthryth, and probably destroyed by the Danes c. 870.

There are ancient earthworks and a mound called Threekingham Beacon to the west of the village.  The post-medieval garden features overlie much older earthworks and tumuli.  The remains of a moated manor house are in Hall Lane.

There is a Whalebone Arch marking the entrance to Laundon Hall.

References

External links

 Village website
 Laundon - a little family background, Stanlaundon.com

Villages in Lincolnshire
Civil parishes in Lincolnshire
North Kesteven District